Theora Stephens is an American hairdresser widely credited with a 1980 patent for "a more efficient pressing and curling iron."  Another source says Stephens “created the pressing/ curling iron in 1983.“

References

20th-century American inventors
Year of birth missing
Possibly living people
American hairdressers